The 2006 Men's Hockey World Cup was the 11th edition of the Hockey World Cup men's field hockey tournament. It was held 6–17 September 2006 in Mönchengladbach, Germany.

Germany won the tournament for second consecutive time after defeating Australia 4–3 in the final. Spain won the third place match by defeating Korea 3–2 with a golden goal.

Qualification

Each of the continental champions from five confederations and the host nation received an automatic berth. The European confederation received one extra quota based upon the FIH World Rankings. Alongside the five teams qualifying through the Qualifier, twelve teams competed in this tournament.

Umpires
The International Hockey Federation appointed 14 umpires for this tournament:

Xavier Adell (ESP)
Christian Blasch (GER)
Henrik Ehlers (DEN)
David Gentles (AUS)
Murray Grime (AUS)
Hamish Jamson (ENG)
Kim Hong-lae (KOR)
Satinder Kumar (IND)
David Leiper (SCO)
Andy Mair (SCO)
Sumesh Putra (CAN)
Amarjit Singh (MAS)
Rob ten Cate (NED)
John Wright (RSA)

Squads

Results
All times are Central European Summer Time (UTC+02:00)

Pool A

Pool B

Ninth to twelfth place classification

Crossover

Eleventh and twelfth place

Ninth and tenth place

Fifth to eighth place classification

Crossover

Seventh and eighth place

Fifth and sixth place

First to fourth place classification

Semi-finals

Third and fourth place

Final

Awards

Statistics

Final standings

Goalscorers

References

External links
Official FIH website

 
Hockey World Cup Men
World Cup
International field hockey competitions hosted by Germany
Men's Hockey World Cup
2000s in North Rhine-Westphalia
Sport in Mönchengladbach
Hockey World Cup Men
21st century in Mönchengladbach